Naoma Judge (September 27, 1908 – June 7, 1978) was an actress of the 1930s. She was also known as Naomi Judge.

Early life
Judge was the daughter of Stephen Judge and  Margaret Ellen Judge. She had eight brothers and two sisters.

Career
Judge initially had no interest in acting. Although producers made efforts to sign her, she preferred to remain enrolled at St. Benedict's College, where she set records as a swimmer. She also studied at Immaculate Heart College.

Judge was of the WAMPAS Baby Stars of 1934 or one of six alternates to the chosen group of 13.

Judge's work on stage included acting with the Ben Bard Dramatic Groups in California.

Personal life
Judge was married to Charles Jordan.

Filmography
 The Man from Arizona (1932) as Lupita 
 Young Blood (1932) Lola Montaine, the Countess
 Terror Trail (1933) as Norma Laird 
 Young and Beautiful (1934) 
 Waterfront Lady (1935) as Mrs. DeLacy 
 Snowed Under (1936) 
 The Golden Arrow (1936) as Mrs. Clarke 
 Gold Diggers of 1937 (1936)

References

External links

 

1908 births
1978 deaths
Actresses from South Dakota
American film actresses
20th-century American actresses
American emigrants to the United Kingdom
WAMPAS Baby Stars